Georgios Poniros (born 8 October 1987) is a professional football goalkeeper. He currently plays for A.E. Ermionida F.C.

Poniros started his career at Akarnanikos. In the summer of 2008, he signed with Panetolikos F.C. On 23 August 2010, he signed a 1-year loan contract with Gamma Ethniki team Aias Salamina F.C. In the summer of 2011, he signed with Diagoras F.C.

References 

1987 births
Living people
Panetolikos F.C. players
Association football goalkeepers
Footballers from Athens
Greek footballers